Laurent Debuire (born 16 November 1970), better known by his stage name Laurent Wolf, is a French electro house producer and DJ. He is the author of several compilations that contain his own tracks and also his remixes. He reached the top of the charts with his "Saxo" and "Calinda" compositions. Laurent Wolf was the winner of the DJ category in the 2008 World Music Awards and perform on the WMA 2008 with international singer Anggun. The single "No Stress", featuring vocals by Éric Carter, was #1 on the French SNEP Singles Chart. On October 28, 2009, DJ Magazine announced the results of their annual Top 100 DJ Poll, with Ultra Records Wolf placed at #66.

Discography

Studio albums

Singles

References

1970 births
French house musicians
Living people
Musicians from Toulouse
World Music Awards winners